Locker may refer to:

 Locker (cabinet), various kinds of storage compartment or container
 Locker (software)
 Locker (surname), various people
 The Lockers, a dance group
 Lockers Bay, a bay of the island of Newfoundland, Canada
 Locking carabiner, a type of carabiner which locks
 Locking differential, a variation on the standard automotive differential; also known as a locker
 Locker, performer of a dance known as locking

See also
 Lock (disambiguation)